FC Argeș Pitești is a football club from Romania which currently plays in Liga I.

Statistics by competition

Statistics by country

Statistics by competition 

Notes for the abbreviations in the tables below:

 1R: First round
 2R: Second round
 3R: Third round
 1QR: First qualifying round
 2QR: Second qualifying round

UEFA Champions League / European Cup

UEFA Europa League / UEFA Cup

Inter-Cities Fairs Cup

External links
  Official website

Romanian football clubs in international competitions
FC Argeș Pitești